The Georgia Tech Glee Club is an a cappella singing group founded in 1906 at the Georgia Institute of Technology. It is a student-run glee club currently directed by Dr. Jerry Ulrich. The Glee Club sings all original arrangements and compositions arranged by Dr. Ulrich and by members of the group.

History

Early years

It is slightly unclear when a group of Tech men first harmonized and called themselves a glee club, but it is accepted that the singers represent the Institute’s oldest student organization still in existence today. "The Glee Club was first started in 1906 and was composed of some eight or 10 men who would gather every afternoon under the Academic Building and practice," Georgia Tech's student newspaper The Technique reported in an October 9, 1917, article introducing new students to campus customs and clubs. An Atlanta Constitution article dated June 20, 1907, records the group’s roots a bit differently. "One of the great social organizations that helps to make the thorny path at Tech tread easier is a musical club organized last February under the suggestive title of the 'Tech Glee Club'." These dates make the Georgia Tech Glee Club the second-oldest collegiate glee club in the Southeast.
In the group's first few decades, the Glee Club would perform in Atlanta and in other cities in Georgia, often combining with the Agnes Scott College Women's Chorale.

The Georgia Tech Glee Club has a long history of performing around the world. In the years immediately following World War II, the Glee Club sang with USO tours in locations from the South Pacific to Korea to Europe.
It appeared twice on The Ed Sullivan Show in 1953 and 1968, during which Ed Sullivan famously barred the Glee Club from singing the line "helluva engineer" in the fight song, "Ramblin' Wreck from Georgia Tech". They also sang the song "There Is Nothing Like a Dame" during the broadcast rehearsal to huge applause, only to have Sullivan cut it from the final lineup.
Despite Ed Sullivan's censorship, the Glee Club was instrumental in spreading the fame of "Ramblin' Wreck" throughout the world, as it was one of the first college choral groups to release a recording of their school songs.
The 1970s saw a dropoff in interest and attendance, which never picked back up until after the new millennium. By 2003, the Club was nearly dead.

Rebirth

At the first rehearsal after the arrival of its current director, Dr. Jerry Ulrich, in 2003, the Glee Club numbered 13 singers, including at least two persons who could not match pitch. That fall semester featured one public performance on the November Choral Concert where the group was sandwiched between the Chamber Choir, the Chorale, and two student-run a cappella groups. However, under Dr. Ulrich and new student officers, growth was quick. In the ensuing three years, the group expanded to 50 singers, and performed hundreds of times in Atlanta and the surrounding region.

In the last few years, the Glee Club has continued to grow in fame and size.  In the past five years alone, the group has performed in Hawaii, New York's Carnegie Hall, Washington, D.C., Southern California, and The United Kingdom. It recorded a full studio album entitled Sing, Kindred Voices in 2006 to mark the Glee Club's Centennial year.

The Modern Glee Club

Each semester, the group performs dozens of times for a wide range of venues, such as Georgia Tech commencement ceremonies, sporting events, college recruitment programs, corporate dinners, church services, alumni receptions, and many more. The Glee Club also sings its own creatively arranged Christmas carols every winter in the Atlanta International Airport, and it will sing songs flashmob-style in the school library and Student Center during the week prior to final exams known as Dead Week.

The Glee Club is well known for its unpredictability during performances that blend rich a Capella music with irreverent humor. Its music spans many genres, including classic rock, funk, jazz, classical, folk, reggae, and collegiate. It is also identified by its unique uniform consisting of blue jeans, a white dress shirt, and a gold tie featuring Georgia Tech's mascot Buzz. The Glee Club currently has approximately 40 members as of Fall 2022, and there is no audition required to join. Its success is largely due to the group of dedicated student officers that organize most of the Glee Club's operations and finances.

See also
 List of collegiate glee clubs

References

External links

 Georgia Tech Glee Club
 Engineers Are People Too! on iTunes

Glee clubs
Georgia Tech
Musical groups established in 1906
1906 establishments in Georgia (U.S. state)